New Dominions is a collaborative album from Horseback and drone rock band Locrian. It was released as a single sided LP by Utech Records on June 18, 2011 and later on CD and digitally through Relapse Records.

Track listing

Personnel
Credits adapted from All Music.

André Foisy – guitar, noise, percussion
Terence Hannum – keyboards, noise, vocals
Steven Hess - drums, loops, noise, percussion
Jenks Miller - bass, editing, engineer, guitar, mixing, noise, percussion, producer, vocals

Production
James Plotkin - mastering, remixing

References

External links 
 

2011 albums
Locrian (band) albums
Relapse Records albums